Christophe Bruno Tony Cocard (born 23 November 1967) is a French former professional footballer who played as a midfielder. He spent the majority of career at AJ Auxerre, while representing France at the Euro 1992.

He also represented Lyon, Kilmarnock in Scotland before a spell in China with Guangdong.

Career statistics

International goal
Score and result list France's goal tally first, score column indicates score after Cocard goal.

Honours
Auxerre
Division 1: 1995–96
Coupe de France: 1993–94, 1995–96

Lyon
UEFA Intertoto Cup: 1997

References

External links
 
 
 
 Profile at French federation official site 

1967 births
Living people
People from Bernay, Eure
Sportspeople from Eure
French footballers
Association football midfielders
France international footballers
AJ Auxerre players
Olympique Lyonnais players
Kilmarnock F.C. players
UEFA Euro 1992 players
Scottish Premier League players
Ligue 1 players
French expatriate footballers
French expatriate sportspeople in Scotland
Expatriate footballers in Scotland
French expatriate sportspeople in China
Expatriate footballers in China
Footballers from Normandy